Halfway is a census-designated place (CDP) in Washington County, Maryland, United States. The population was 11,896 at the 2020 census. It is named due to its location, which is halfway between Hagerstown and Williamsport. As a major suburb of Hagerstown, Halfway is part of the Hagerstown-Martinsburg, MD-WV, Metropolitan Statistical Area.

Geography
Halfway is located at  (39.616346, −77.765562).

Demographics

2010

2000
As of the census of 2000, there were 10,065 people, 4,275 households, and 2,851 families residing in the CDP. The racial makeup of the CDP was 95.47% White, 2.13% African American, 0.09% Native American, 0.97% Asian, 0.12% Pacific Islander, 0.24% from other races, and 0.98% from two or more races. Hispanic or Latino of any race were 1.09% of the population.

There were 4,275 households, out of which 26.9% had children under the age of 18 living with them, 53.2% were married couples living together, 10.4% had a female householder with no husband present, and 33.3% were non-families. 29.1% of all households were made up of individuals, and 16.1% had someone living alone who was 65 years of age or older. The average household size was 2.32 and the average family size was 2.85.

In the CDP, the population was spread out, with 22.2% under the age of 18, 5.9% from 18 to 24, 26.5% from 25 to 44, 23.5% from 45 to 64, and 21.9% who were 65 years of age or older. The median age was 42 years. For every 100 females, there were 86.5 males. For every 100 females age 18 and over, there were 81.6 males.

The median income for a household in the CDP was $41,892, and the median income for a family was $51,143. Males had a median income of $36,847 versus $26,008 for females. The per capita income for the CDP was $21,518. About 4.3% of families and 5.6% of the population were below the poverty line, including 6.7% of those under age 18 and 5.0% of those age 65 or over.

References

External links

 Valley Mall

Census-designated places in Washington County, Maryland
Census-designated places in Maryland
Suburbs in Maryland